The World Wide Tours bus crash took place at about 5:30 a.m. on March 12, 2011, in the southbound lanes of the New England Thruway segment of Interstate 95 within Pelham Bay Park near Split Rock at the border between the Bronx and Pelham Manor, New York. The bus was returning to Chinatown, Manhattan, from the Mohegan Sun casino in Uncasville, Connecticut. It swerved and collided with a metal sign pole, which ripped through it and tore off most of its roof. Thirteen passengers died at the scene, two died at hospitals, and all seventeen others on board were injured.

Cause

Conditions of the crash
Some surviving passengers have said that the driver, Ophadell Williams, fell asleep at the wheel. He was not charged initially, pending investigation. Williams said that he was awake and sober at the time of the accident. The bus driver 
blamed the accident on a tractor-trailer that he swerved to avoid, causing the bus to flip on its side and crash into an overhead highway sign which split the bus in half. He said the two possibly hit each other.

The crash triggered an investigation by the New York State Police and National Transportation Safety Board.

Preliminary NTSB findings
A preliminary report by the NTSB in April 2011 found that the bus was going  at the time of the crash, 14 miles per hour faster than the posted  speed limit. The report found that the bus had been exceeding the speed limit on I-95 45 seconds before it veered off the highway. The report said that there was no evidence of contact between the bus and a passing truck, as claimed by the driver.
The truck driver was located by authorities, denied the bus driver's account and was cleared of responsibility. State officials revoked the bus driver's driving privileges after reports became public of Williams's criminal record, which includes having served time for convictions of manslaughter and larceny.

Prosecution of Ophadell Williams
The driver, Ophadell Williams, was charged by the Bronx County District Attorney's office with 54 felony and misdemeanor counts, including charges of criminally negligent homicide and manslaughter. Prosecutors argued that Williams was too tired to get behind the wheel, and was so sleep-deprived that his actions were no different than someone driving under the influence. 

Williams was held in custody from September 2011 until the end of his trial due to being unable to meet his $250,000 bail. On December 7, 2012, the jury found Williams not guilty of all charges except one count of misdemeanor aggravated unlicensed operation of a motor vehicle. Due to spending over a year in jail, his sentence was commuted to time served. Years later, Williams, then employed as an MTA traffic checker, was lauded as a hero in the media after he spotted smoke coming from a utility room at a subway station in Queens, New York, and quickly evacuated passengers to their safety.

See also
 Chinatown bus lines

References

External links
 
 
 

Bus incidents in the United States
2011 disasters in the United States
2010s in the Bronx
Chinatown bus lines
Chinese-American history
Intercity bus companies of the United States
2011 road incidents
2011 in New York City
Transportation accidents in New York City
Pelham Bay Park
Disasters in the Bronx